Michel Mohrt (28 April 1914 – 17 August 2011) was an editor, essayist, novelist and historian of French literature.

Mohrt was born in Morlaix, Finistère. He was elected to the Académie française on 18 April 1985.  Mohrt died at the age of 97 on 17 August 2011.

Biography
Mohrt entered the literary world at the age of 14, creating woodcuts for a book by the renowned French writer Jakez Breton-Riou. He studied law and literature at the University of Rennes. After obtaining a degree in law he applied at the barreau de Morlaix in 1937. He was a strong supporter of the "Action Française".

He fought with distinction during the 1940 Alpine Line campaign against the Italians, most notably in the Vésubie. During this campaign he fought alongside the famous Jean Bassompierre, who, after the campaign against the Italians, enlisted in the Wehrmacht to fight Bolshevism. Michel Mohrt gave him recognition in his work Tombeau de La Rouërie.

He was a long-time editor at Éditions Gallimard, where he was a specialist in North American literature. In 1962 he received the Grand Prize in the category of novels from the Académie française for his novel Sea Prison and was elected to the Académie on 18 April 1985.

Bibliography

1943  Montherlant, « homme libre »   (Gallimard)
1943  Les Intellectuels devant la défaite de 1870   (Buchet-Chastel)
1945  Le Répit, roman  (Albin Michel)
1948  Le Cavalier de la nuit, R. Penn Warren  (Stock)
1949  Mon royaume pour un cheval   (Albin Michel)
1951  Les Nomades   (Albin Michel)
1952  Marin-la-Meslée   (Pierre Horay)
1953  Le Serviteur fidèle   (Albin Michel)
1955  Le Nouveau Roman américain   (Gallimard)
1956  La Littérature d’Amérique du Nord, dans Histoire des Littératures, tome II  (Gallimard)
1961  La Prison maritime (Gallimard) – Grand Prix du roman de l'Académie française
1963  La Marche de nuit, William Styron  (Gallimard)
1965  La Campagne d’Italie  (Gallimard)
1969  L’Ours des Adirondacks  (Gallimard)
1970  L’Air du large (Gallimard)
1970  Un jeu d’enfer, théâtre  (Gallimard)
1974  Deux Indiennes à Paris   (Gallimard)
1975  Les Moyens du bord   (Gallimard)
1979  La Maison du père, récit  (Gallimard)
1980  Paquebots, le temps des traversées  (Éditions Maritimes et d’outremer)
1986  La Guerre civile  (Gallimard)
1988  Vers l’Ouest  (Olivier Orban)
1988  L’Air du large II  (Gallimard)
1989  Le Télésiège  (Gallimard)
1989  Benjamin ou Lettres sur l’inconstance  (Gallimard)
1991  L’Air du temps  (Le Rocher)
1991  Un soir, à Londres  (Gallimard)
1992  Monsieur l’Ambassadeur, théâtre  (Gallimard)
1992  On liquide et on s’en va, sotie  (Gallimard)
1996  Les Dimanches de Venise  (Gallimard)
1998  Bouvard et Pécuchet, de Gustave Flaubert  (Gallimard)
1998  L’Ile des fous, nouvelles  (Le Rocher)
1999  De bonne et mauvaise humeur  (Le Rocher)
2000  Tombeau de La Rouërie  (Gallimard)
2002  Jessica ou l'amour affranchi  (Gallimard)

See also
 The European (magazine)

External links
 Short bio on the Académie française website 

1914 births
2011 deaths
People from Morlaix
Members of the Académie Française
Grand Prix du roman de l'Académie française winners
Commandeurs of the Ordre des Arts et des Lettres
French military personnel of World War II
Officiers of the Légion d'honneur
Recipients of the Croix de Guerre 1939–1945 (France)
Recipients of the Croix de Guerre (France)
University of Rennes alumni
French male writers
20th-century French non-fiction writers